The Little Shashiskau River is a river in northern Cochrane District in Northeastern Ontario, Canada. It is part of the James Bay drainage basin, and is a right tributary of the Shashiskau River.

The river begins at an unnamed lake in the Shashiskau Hills and flows north then northwest to Shashiskau Lake as a right tributary of the Shashiskau River. The Shashiskau River flows via the Kesagami River and the Harricana River to James Bay.

See also
List of rivers of Ontario

References

Sources

Rivers of Cochrane District